The Men's Abierto Mexicano de Raquetas 2014 is the men's edition of the 2014 Abierto Mexicano de Raquetas, which is a tournament of the PSA World Tour event International (prize money: $70,000). The event took place in Huixquilucan in Mexico from 18 September to 22 September. Mohamed El Shorbagy won his first Abierto Mexicano de Raquetas trophy, beating Marwan El Shorbagy in the final.

Prize money and ranking points
For 2014, the prize purse was $70,000. The prize money and points breakdown is as follows:

Seeds

Draw and results

See also
PSA World Tour 2014
Abierto Mexicano de Raquetas

References

External links
PSA Abierto Mexicano de Raquetas 2014 website
Abierto Mexicano de Raquetas official website

Squash tournaments in Mexico
Abierto Mexicano de Raquetas
Abierto Mexicano de Raquetas